Murave is a small settlement in the Municipality of Gorenja Vas–Poljane in the Upper Carniola region of Slovenia. It lies in the Škofja Loka Hills north of Poljane.

References

External links 

Murave on Geopedia

Populated places in the Municipality of Gorenja vas-Poljane